The Green Pine UHF communications system was designed to relay Strategic Air Command (SAC) Emergency Action Messages (EAMs) to SAC aircraft. Green Pine was designed in 1967. Each Green Pine station was equipped with a variety of communications systems, to ensure that nuclear command and control messages would reach nuclear strategic bombers in Northern latitudes.

Locations
 Adak, Alaska
 Naval Station Argentia, Newfoundland
 Barter Island
 Cambridge Bay
 Cape Dyer
 Cape Parry
 Cold Bay
 Dye 3
 Hall Beach
 Melville
 Keflavik, Iceland
 Point Barrow
 Thule, Greenland

See also
 Survivable Low Frequency Communications System (SLFCS)
 Post Attack Command and Control System (PACCS)
 Ground Wave Emergency Network (GWEN)
 Minimum Essential Emergency Communications Network (MEECN)
 Emergency Rocket Communications System (ERCS)

References

External links
 Green Pine System: Loring AFB, Maine

Military radio systems of the United States
Military communications of the United States
United States nuclear command and control